Dogs of Berlin is a streaming television series and the second German series produced for Netflix after Dark. First pictures of the ongoing production were shown in April 2018, after production started in November 2017.

The first season was released on Netflix on December 7, 2018.

Plot 
Police officers Erol Birkan and Kurt Grimmer investigate the murder of the fictional Turkish-German football star Orkan Erdem. The act sends Berlin into a frenzy, and the list of potential suspects is long: Neo-Nazis from the Marzahn borough of Berlin, the Arab Mafia from the same neighborhood as the footballer, Turkish nationalists angry with the superstar playing for Germany instead of Turkey, football fans, and the Berlin Mafia. The chain of evidence may even lead to the highest offices of the capital. In order to uncover the truth, the two police officers have to venture deep down into the Berlin underworld.

Cast 
 Fahri Yardım as Erol Birkan, an ethnic Turkish German police officer who is transferred from his drug investigation to co-head the task force investigating the murder of a celebrity Turkish-German footballer
 Felix Kramer as Kurt Grimmer, a homicide detective who has a severe gambling problem that creates several work-related problems. He co-heads the task force alongside Birkan.
 Urs Rechn as Gert Seiler, Grimmer's immediate supervisor
 Katharina Schüttler as Paula Grimmer, Kurt's wife.
 Anna Maria Mühe as Sabine 'Bine' Ludar, as a Girlfriend of Kurt Grimmer
 Kais Setti as Kareem Tarik-Amir
 Mohammed Issa as Murad Issam, a young teenager
 Deniz Orta as Maïssa Issam
 Katrin Sass as Eva Grimmer, Kurt's deeply racist mother
 Sebastian Zimmler as Ulf Grimmer, head of a white nationalist gang
 Alina Stiegler as Petrović
 Hannah Herzsprung as Trinity Sommer
 Antonio Wannek as Hans Kuscha
 Mišel Matičević as Tomo Kovač
 Ivan Vrgoč as Stipe
 Jasna Fritzi Bauer as Nike Strack, an employee who beats and urinates on Paula after she is fired for stealing
 Constantin von Jascheroff as Robert Fucht, another homicide detective who is both suspicious and jealous of Grimmer
 Imad Mardnli as Wahid
 Branko Tomović as Dario
 Samy Abdel Fattah as Raif Tarik-Amir
 Giannina Erfany-Far as Kamila 
 Sinan Farhangmehr as Hakim Tarik-Amir 
 Sebastian Achilles as Guido Mack 
 Hauke Diekamp	as Wachtmeister
 Lena Schmidtke as Mandy Klink
 Langston Uibel as Raphael Bou'Penga 
 Yasin El Harrouk as Fahd 
 Robert Gallinowski as Johann Henkenmaier
 Renato Schuch as Murathan Canavar 
 Paul Wollin as Gregor Munn 
 Seyneb Saleh as Rafika Masaad
 Jan Bülow as Tom Kriftel 
 Deniz Cooper as Aykut Kubat
 Eray Egilmez as Pusat Erdem 
 Anne Müller as Gesine Kramer
 Yung Ngo as Karsten Nguyen 
 Niels-Bruno Schmidt as Bruno Przybylla
 Aram Tafreshian as Lars Niedermann 
 Dora Zygouri as Emilia Grimmer 
 Markus Boysen	as Walther Laubach 
 Werner Daehn as Hardy Kranz 
 Tyron Ricketts as Leon Bou' Penga 
 Leonas Sielaff as Thor Ludar
 Malte Thomsen	as Eckard Meiser

Episodes

Season 1 (2018)

References

External links
 
 
 

Serial drama television series
German-language Netflix original programming
2018 German television series debuts
Television shows set in Berlin